Alejo Bay (1891 – January 30, 1952) was a Mexican - American political leader.

Early life
Bay was born in Álamos, Sonora. His father was Thomas Bay, an Irish-American and Confederate soldier from St. Louis, Missouri, that went to live in Alamos after The Union won the war.

Political career
Don Alejo Bay figured during a long time in political and federal issues in the Mexican state of  Sonora. Alejo Bay was two times federal deputy, senator of the republic, local deputy and governor of Sonora during the Constitutional period from 1923 to 1927. He was also the Secretary of Treasury during 1939, under the command of general Macias Valenzuela. He was good friends with President Álvaro Obregón. During 1920, as a senator, he joined a group that was led by generals Jose Gonzalo Escobar and Fausto Topete, against president Plutarco Elias Calles for betraying his comrade Alvaro Obregon which caused him to march in the desert for five years.

Death
Alejo Bay died January 30, 1952, in Rochester, Minnesota, United States.

Sources

  States

1891 births
People from Álamos
Mexican people of Irish descent
Mexican emigrants to the United States
Governors of Sonora
Members of the Chamber of Deputies (Mexico)
Members of the Senate of the Republic (Mexico)
1952 deaths
20th-century Mexican politicians
Members of the Congress of Sonora